The Exile (New York: John Day, 1936) is a memoir/biography, or work of creative non-fiction, written by Pearl S. Buck about her mother, Caroline Stulting Sydenstricker (1857–1921), describing her life growing up in West Virginia and life in China as the wife of the Presbyterian missionary Absalom Sydenstricker. The book is deeply critical of her father and the mission work in China for their treatment of women. Buck also traces the arc of her mother's disillusionment with religion. The success of the book led Buck to write a parallel memoir of her father, .

Although the book was not published until 1936, Buck wrote a draft just after her mother died in 1920, then stashed the manuscript in the wall so that her future children might know their grandmother. “Carie,” as she calls her mother in the book, went to China in hopes that God would speak to her if she made the sacrifice of becoming a missionary, but soon found she had exiled herself from her American home and family. When the deaths of three of her children in China made her sacrifice seem meaningless, she exiled herself also from the traditional patriarchal God of her parents and finally even from her husband. In Buck's description, Carie built a succession of homes for her children and bestowed charity on neighbors and strangers even as she offered unbending moral judgment on her family.  “Carie’s daughter,” as Pearl called herself, determined to never make her mother’s mistake of subordinating herself to either a man or to a zealous creed.

Notes

Reading
 , originally New York: John Day.
 .
 .

Works by Pearl S. Buck
1936 non-fiction books
Novels set in West Virginia
Novels set in China
John Day Company books
Works about missionaries